Montanic acid is a saturated fatty acid isolated and detected mainly in montan wax. It also occurs in beeswax and Chinese wax. Montanic acid ethylene glycol esters and glycerol esters are used as protective layer on fruit skins and coating on foods.
 It is known as E number reference E912.

References

External links
 EMBL-EBI
 JSTOR

Fatty acids
Alkanoic acids
E-number additives